Catherine Suire and Catherine Tanvier won in the final 6–4, 4–6, 6–2 against Isabelle Demongeot and Nathalie Tauziat.

Seeds
Champion seeds are indicated in bold text while text in italics indicates the round in which those seeds were eliminated.

 Catherine Suire /  Catherine Tanvier (champions)
 Isabelle Demongeot /  Nathalie Tauziat (final)
 Nathalie Herreman /  Pascale Paradis (semifinals)
 Sabrina Goleš /  Patricia Tarabini (semifinals)

Draw

References
 1988 WTA Nice Open Doubles Draw

WTA Nice Open
1988 WTA Tour